John Law (born 16 May 1946), is a sociologist and science and technology studies scholar, currently on the Faculty of Social Sciences at the Open University and key proponent of Actor-network theory. Actor-network theory, sometimes abbreviated to ANT, is a social science approach for describing and explaining social, organisational, scientific and technological structures, processes and events. It assumes that all the components of such structures (whether these are human or otherwise) form a network of relations that can be mapped and described in the same terms or vocabulary.

Developed by two leading French STS scholars, Michel Callon and Bruno Latour, Law himself, and others, ANT may alternatively be described as a 'material-semiotic' method. ANT strives to map relations that are simultaneously material (between things) and 'semiotic' (between concepts), for instance, the interactions in a bank involve both people and their ideas, and computers. Together these form a single network.

Professor John Law was one of the directors of the ESRC funded Centre for Research on Socio-Cultural Change.

Bibliography

Authored

Edited

See also 
 Actor-network theory
 Bruno Latour
 Michel Callon
 Annemarie Mol

References

External links
 John Law at The Open University
 HeterogeneitiesDOTnet: John Law's STS Web Page

1946 births
Academics of the Open University
Actor-network theory
British sociologists
Living people
Sociologists of science